Thomas H. Lane is an American organic chemist, and Director at Dow Corning Corporation. He served as president of the American Chemical Society in 2009.

Life 
He graduated from Purdue University and from Central Michigan University. While working at Dow, he received a PhD from the Open University, of which he is a visiting professor. He is a Fellow of the Royal Society of Chemistry.
He was vice-president at Delta College.

References 

Organic chemists
21st-century American chemists
Presidents of the American Chemical Society
Dow Chemical Company employees
Purdue University alumni
Central Michigan University alumni
Alumni of the Open University
Living people
Year of birth missing (living people)